John Timbrill, D.D. (1773 in Pershore – 1864 in Gloucester) was Archdeacon of Gloucester from 14 May 1825 until his death.

Sheringham was educated at Worcester College, Oxford. He held incumbencies at Beckford with Ashton under Hill, Bretforton and Dursley.

He died on 8 December 1864.

References

1773 births
People from Pershore
Alumni of Worcester College, Oxford
Archdeacons of Gloucester
1864 deaths